In certi momenti (At Certain Times) is the third album by Italian pop/rock singer Eros Ramazzotti, produced by Piero Cassano and released in 1987 on the BMG label.

The decision was taken not to release any singles from In certi momenti in the domestic Italian market, although "La luce buona delle stelle" was released in other European territories.  This track features the first of many vocal collaborations between Ramazzotti and other singers, in this case English singer/actress Patsy Kensit.

Track listing 
(All tracks written by Pierangelo Cassano, Adelio Cogliati, Eros Ramazzotti)
 "Questo mio vivere un po' fuori" - 4:19 
 "OK ci sto" - 3:57 
 "La luce buona delle stelle" - 4:14 (duet with Patsy Kensit)
 "Il gioco della verità" - 4:36 
 "Ma che bello questo amore" - 4:10 
 "Ciao pà" - 5:01 
 "Cose che ho visto" - 4:09
 "Libero dialogo" - 4:35 
 "Occhi di speranza" - 3:16 
 "Senza perderci di vista" - 4:15

Certifications and sales

References

Eros Ramazzotti albums
1987 albums
Sony Music Italy albums